Michelle Laine is an American fashion designer and costume designer based in Los Angeles, California.

Laine designed the costume's for the 2020 feature film Archenemy (film), as well as music videos for Floria Sigismondi, John Mayer, Phoenix, A-Trak The Chainsmokers, and Yves Tumor. Her jewelry and fashion designs have been worn by Tilda Swinton, Elle Fanning, Marion Cotillard, Katy Perry, Alessandra Ambrosio, Kristen Stewart,  Jared Leto,  and Brandy.

She is the daughter of extreme water-sports athlete Randy Laine.

References

American fashion designers
American women fashion designers
Living people
American women bloggers
American bloggers
Year of birth missing (living people)
21st-century American women